Zea is a surname. Notable people with the surname include:

Jaime Zea (born 1970), Mayor of the Villa El Salvador district of Lima, Peru
Kristi Zea (born 1948), American production designer, costume designer, art director, and director
María Luisa Zea (1913–2002), Mexican actress and singer
Natalie Zea (born 1975), American actress
Leopoldo Zea Aguilar (1912–2004), Mexican philosopher
Francisco Antonio Zea (1766–1822), South American statesman, diplomat and botanist

See also
 Cea (surname)